Sri Maha Vishnumoorthy Temple is located in the village of Karval in the karkal(tq) of Udupi district, Karnataka, India. Karval is located in between Udupi and Kakala at a distance of 28 km. from Udupi and 15 km. from Karkala. Thousands of the devotees, including former Indian Cricketer Ravi Shastri, visit the temple, the main attraction of the village, to seek blessing from Lord Maha Vishnu and Naga.

References 

Hindu temples in Udupi district